Giuliano Biatta (born 14 May 1957) is an Italian former professional racing cyclist. He rode in the 1982 Tour de France.

References

External links
 

1957 births
Living people
Italian male cyclists
Cyclists from the Province of Brescia